Benjamin Genton (born 20 May 1980) is a French former professional footballer who played as a defender.

External links

1980 births
Living people
Association football defenders
French footballers
Ligue 1 players
Ligue 2 players
Montpellier HSC players
US Créteil-Lusitanos players
FC Lorient players
FC Versailles 78 players
Le Havre AC players